Alberto Bernardes Costa (born in Alcobaça, 1947) was the Portuguese Minister of Justice (Ministro da Justiça) from  12 March 2005 to 26 October 2009.

References

External links

1947 births
Living people
People from Alcobaça, Portugal
Socialist Party (Portugal) politicians
Justice ministers of Portugal